Designation may refer to:

 Designation (law), the process of determining an incumbent's successor
 Professional certification
 Designation (landmarks), an official classification determined by a government agency or historical society
 Designation Scheme, a system for recognising library and museum collections in England

See also 
 
 
 United States Department of Defense aerospace vehicle designation
 Designate (Columbia)
 Design